Orce is a municipality located in the province of Granada, in southeastern Spain. According to the 2009 census (INE), the city has a population of 1333 inhabitants.

Paleoanthropology 
Orce is the location of the paleo-archaeological sites known as Barranco León, Venta Micena, and Fuente Nueva 3, near the basin of an ancient lake where fossils have been preserved in sediment. Josep Gibert of the M. Crusafont Institute in Sabadell has led an excavation team there. He asserts that the sites have Oldowan-style stone tools dating between 1.5 and 1.8 million years ago. If the early estimates are supported, these would represent the oldest stone tool finds in Europe. Other scholars prefer a more conservative date for the stone tools of 1.2 million years. Together with the hominid remains at the Atapuerca Mountains, the tools are evidence that human ancestors settled in western Europe more than one million years (Ma) ago.

Recent numerical dating studies using Electron Spin Resonance (ESR) method applied to fossil teeth and quartz grains have provided ages of ca. 1.2 Ma for Fuente Nueva 3, and ca. 1.4 Ma for Barranco León and Venta Micena.

References

External links 
 Official site of the Village of Orce 

Municipalities in the Province of Granada